The list of ship launches in 1936 includes a chronological list of some ships launched in 1936.

References

Sources

1936
Ship launches